Kelly Gene Hancock (born December 2, 1963) is an American businessman and Republican State Senator for District 9, which encompasses portions of Tarrant and Dallas counties, including all or part of the following communities in Tarrant County: Arlington, Bedford, Colleyville, Euless, Fort Worth, Grand Prairie, Grapevine, Haltom City, Hurst, Keller, North Richland Hills, Richland Hills, Saginaw, Southlake, Trophy Club, Watauga and Westlake. In Dallas County, Senate District 9 includes portions of Dallas, Grand Prairie, and Irving. Hancock was elected to the Texas Senate in November 2012, having previously served three terms in the Texas House of Representatives.

Personal life 
A Fort Worth native, Hancock has resided his entire life in the Mid-Cities area of Tarrant County. In 2003, Hancock and his brother Cary founded Advanced Chemical Logistics, a chemical distribution company in Northeast Fort Worth.

Hancock graduated from Baylor University in Waco, Texas, in 1986 with a Bachelor of Business Administration. Hancock and his wife Robin live in North Richland Hills with their children: Chloe, Skylar and Harrison.

Political career 

Hancock is a lifelong conservative who began his political career serving for thirteen years on the Birdville ISD school board. In 2006, he was elected to the first of three consecutive terms in the Texas House of Representatives or District 91.

In the Texas Senate's 83rd Legislative Session of 2013, Hancock was tabbed to serve on the following committees: Transportation, Jurisprudence, Business and Commerce, and Senate Administration. Hancock serves as the vice chairman for the Economic Development Committee.

In September 2013, Hancock announced his intent to run for a second term in the Senate.

Hancock was named one of the "Worst Legislators" in Texas by Texas Monthly magazine in 2017.

In 2021, Republicans in the Texas legislature drew heavily pro-Republican gerrymandered maps to vastly increase the number of safe Republican districts. Hancock's district, which had been a competitive district in the 2020 election, was redrawn to make it much more Republican.

Legislation

NCAA championship game in Arlington 
In April 2013, Hancock authored Senate Bill 398, which ensured AT&T Stadium in Arlington would be eligible for state funds in the facility's pursuit of a BCS National Championship game in College Football. Governor Rick Perry signed the bill into law. Arlington and AT&T Stadium will host college football's first playoff National Championship Game after the 2014 season.

Voter fraud

In the 2017 special legislative session, Hancock spoke in support of a bill to increase the penalty from misdemeanor to felony when one is convicted of intentionally submitting false information on a mail-in ballot application. Hancock said mail-in voting has been targeted for illegal voting and election fraud and that the legislation is needed. Democrat Jose Menendez of San Antonio, however, argued against the legislation on grounds of "unintended consequences."

Delivery of alcoholic beverages
In 2019 Hancock co-sponsored a bill that was signed by governor Greg Abbott on June 12, 2019. Dealing with the sale and delivery of alcoholic beverages to private citizens. This law allows food establishments to sale and deliver alcohol along with food deliveries.

2018 reelection
Hancock was reelected to the state Senate in the general election held on November 6, 2018. With 132,001 votes (54.1 percent), he defeated his Democratic opponent, Gwenn Burud, who polled 112,113 (45.9 percent). His margin in Tarrant County was sufficient to overcome his loss in increasingly Democratic Dallas County.

Electoral history 
2012 Texas Senate General Election

Won with 58.37% of vote

2012 Texas Senate Republican Party Primary Election

Won with 64.96% of vote

Texas House District 91, 2010 General Election

Won with 100.00% of vote

Texas House District 91, 2010 Republican Party Primary Election

Won with 75.36% of vote

Texas House District 91, 2008 General Election

Won with 61.27% of vote

Texas House District 91, 2008 Republican Party Primary Election

Won with 100.00% of vote

Texas House District 91, 2006 General Election

Won with 59.07% of vote

Texas House District 91, 2006 Republican Party Primary Election

Won with 52.46% of vote

References

External links

|-

|-

1963 births
21st-century American politicians
Baylor University alumni
Businesspeople from Texas
Living people
People from North Richland Hills, Texas
Politicians from Fort Worth, Texas
Republican Party members of the Texas House of Representatives
Republican Party Texas state senators
School board members in Texas